Matthias Kessler (born 16 May 1979 in Nuremberg) is a German former professional road racing cyclist who competed from 2000 to 2007 for  and .

Biography
Kessler debuted as a pro during the 2000 season after becoming German under 23 champion in 1999, a year in which he also took the bronze medal in the under 23 cycling world championships. Despite the fact that he has only 3 wins in his palmarès, which includes two consecutive victories at the Gran Premio Miguel Induráin and LUK-Cup of 2003, he is seen as an outsider for the Ardennes classic races.

In Grand Tours, Kessler won Stage 3 of the 2006 Tour de France in a late breakaway. The previous day on Stage 2, he was caught by the peloton less than 50 meters from the finish line.  He had to abandon the 2004 Tour de France after a serious and spectacular fall caused him severe injuries, even though he managed to end the stage. In the 2005 Tour de France, he was part of the T-Mobile line-up and almost got a win at Mende.

Kessler is known for riding with his jersey open and also for wearing an undershirt intentionally torn for better cooling. In January 2010, he had a collision with a cat while on a training ride in Mallorca, Spain, and was left in a critical condition with severe head injuries.

Doping
On 27 June 2007 Kessler was suspended by Astana for failing a drugs test for testosterone taken in Charleroi in April 2007. He was fired from the team on 13 July. Later named as a recipient of a blood transfusion at the University of Freiburg along with teammates Andreas Klöden and Patrick Sinkewitz during the 2006 Tour de France.

Major results

1997
 2nd Overall Grand Prix Rüebliland
 5th Road race, UCI Junior Road World Championships
1999
 1st  Road race, National Under-23 Road Championships
 3rd  Road race, UCI Under-23 Road World Championships
 3rd Gran Premio della Liberazione
2001
 2nd Overall Hessen Rundfahrt
2002
 2nd Giro del Piemonte
 3rd Luk-Cup Bühl
 6th Liège–Bastogne–Liège
2003
 1st Luk-Cup Bühl
 1st GP Miguel Induráin
 5th Amstel Gold Race
 8th Milano–Torino
2004
 1st GP Miguel Induráin
 3rd La Flèche Wallonne
 6th Liège–Bastogne–Liège
 6th Amstel Gold Race
 7th Paris–Tours
 7th Milano–Torino
2005
 7th GP Miguel Induráin
 10th Overall Volta a la Comunitat Valenciana
2006
 1st Stage 3 Tour de France
 2nd Road race, National Road Championships
 10th La Flèche Wallonne
2007
 4th La Flèche Wallonne
 4th Amstel Gold Race
 8th Liège–Bastogne–Liège

Grand Tour general classification results timeline

See also
 List of doping cases in cycling
List of sportspeople sanctioned for doping offences

References

External links

1979 births
Living people
German Tour de France stage winners
German sportspeople in doping cases
Doping cases in cycling
German male cyclists
Sportspeople from Nuremberg
Cyclists from Bavaria
20th-century German people
21st-century German people